The PTM-3 (Russian: ПТМ-3: ПротивоТанковая Мина-3) is a Soviet scatterable self-liquidating shaped charge anti-tank mine. The mine's case is made up of a stamped steel body with notches in its side. The notches allow the mine to produce a shaped charge effect on five sides - 4 on the sides, and one on the end face. The mine has two arming stages - pyrotechnic and mechanical, and has a magnetic influence battery-powered fuze BT-06 (Russian: БТ-06). The mine can be delivered using the BM-30 Smerch (9M55K4), BM-27 Uragan (9M59), BM-21 Grad (9M22K) MLRS, helicopter-mounted minelaying system VSM-1, remote mining machine UMZ (Russian: УМЗ) or portable mining kit PKM (Russian: ПКМ: Переносной Комплект Минирования). It cannot be placed manually, and must only be placed using remote minelaying systems listed above.

Action 
The mine can only be deployed on soil with the use of various minelaying systems, within the KPTM-3 cassettes - each containing one PTM-3 mine. A rope is attached to the body of the cassette and the pin of the mine. Once the cassette bursts, the rope pulls on the pin of the mine, completing the mechanical stage of arming. When on the ground, upon the burnout time of the pyrotechnic moderator has elapsed, the fuze moves into "combat position". The arming process generally takes 60 seconds after the trigger of the thermal sensor.

When an armored vehicle drives over the mine, due to fluctuations in the magnetic field, the mine is triggered. The created shaped charges as a result of the explosion penetrate the tank, and kill the crew inside or damage the tank systems.

If the someone attempts to dislocate the mine when it is armed, it explodes due to the influence of the Earth's magnetic field. If no target has been detected, the mine self-destructs after the completion of the self-liqudation period.

Destruction 
Installed PTM-3 mines cannot be removed by dislocation. The mines self-destruct 16-24 hours after deployment. If a mine has not self-destructed upon the completion of the set self-liquidation timeframe, it is destroyed using a remotely-triggered explosive charge weighing 0.2-0.4 kgs placed next to the mine. It is prohibited to destroy the PTM-3 mines before the self-liquidation period has elapsed, as the placement of the explosive charge could trigger the mine. If the mine must absolutely be removed before the self-liquidation period has elapsed, it can be destroyed by machine gun fire, preferably mounted on an armored vehicle.

Specifications
 Mass
 Charge: 1.8 kg of TG-40 (60/40 RDX/TNT)
 Deployed: 4.9 kg
 Full assembly: 8.5 kg
 Dimensions (mm): 330x84x84
 Self-liquidation time (h): 16-24 (depends on weather conditions)
 Temperature range of use (°С): -40 to +50
 Shelf life: 10 years

See also 
 PFM-1
 PMN mine
 Anti-tank mine

Notes 

Anti-tank mines
Land mines of the Soviet Union